Rex Floyd Rammell (born January 2, 1961) is an American veterinarian and perennial candidate for public office in Idaho and Wyoming.

Early life
Rammell was born on January 2, 1961, in Tetonia, Idaho and was raised in Eastern Idaho.

Career
Rammell is a veterinarian, former elk rancher and author of the recently released book titled, "A Nation Divided: The War For America's Soul".

Political Campaigns
Rammell is a perennial candidate for public office in Idaho and Wyoming.

Idaho Elections 
He ran unsuccessfully in the 2008 Idaho senatorial election against Incumbent Republican U.S. Senator Jim Risch, polling 5.4% of the vote.

In 2009 announced that he would seek the Republican nomination for governor in the 2010 Idaho gubernatorial election. He came in second to Incumbent Governor Butch Otter, polling 42,436 (26%) to Otter's 89,117 (54.6%). Rammell defeated Otter in two counties and tied him in another. Rammell's top county was Benewah where he polled nearly 58% of the vote to Otter's 33%. Rammell's number two county was Idaho County where he polled 46% to Otter's 40%. Both candidates polled 43% in Boundary County, with Otter receiving two votes more than Rammell.

In 2012, Rammell ran in the Republican primary for District 7 in the Idaho House of Representatives, but came in second place out of 3 candidates with 30.3% of the vote.

Wyoming Elections 
In 2016, Rammell ran for United States Congress in the State of Wyoming as a Republican and took 7th place, losing to Liz Cheney.

In 2018, Rammell ran for Governor of Wyoming in 2018 as a Constitution Party candidate and took 3rd, losing to Mark Gordon.

In 2021, Rammell announced that he would seek the Republican nomination for Governor of Wyoming against Mark Gordon.

Elections

Controversies

Obama threats
In August 2009, while at a town hall meeting opposing proposed national health care legislation, Rammell was briefly involved in a controversy when it was reported that he had joked about seeking a license to hunt President Barack Obama. The controversy stemmed from an event that Rammell had attended in Twin Falls, Idaho where he was speaking to a group of sportsmen about the upcoming wolf hunt when a woman in the audience asked, "what about Obama tags?" Rammell replied in jest, "yeah, we'd buy some of those." Rammell later apologized for his actions.

Constitution to "Hang by a Thread" in the last days

In January 2010, Rammell faced controversy when he invited friends of his to a meeting to discuss a prophecy of Joseph Smith which purportedly stated that the Constitution would "hang by a thread" in the last days before the elders of the Church of Jesus Christ of Latter-day Saints (LDS Church) would save it.  Rammell had never mentioned the so-called White Horse prophecy but mentioned the alleged quote by Joseph Smith in an effort to resonate Rammell's perceived seriousness of the political climate to fellow members of his church. The LDS Church disavowed these meetings, and Rammell later apologized for not making them public.

Legal issues

Elk Hunt
In August 2006, nearly 160 elk escaped from Rammell's Chief Joseph hunting preserve just ten miles outside of Yellowstone National Park. In September 2006, facing pressure from anti game farming advocates, Idaho Governor Jim Risch ordered an emergency hunt to kill the loose elk from Rammell's ranch.

In September 2006, Rammell was charged with obstructing a police officer after he refused to get off a dead elk that had been killed by authorities. Rammell was upset that the Fish and Game officer had killed his elk right in front of his capture pen.  Following a 12 hours trial, he was acquitted by a six-person jury in Fremont County, Idaho in March 2007.

When Rammell's daughter won the Miss Idaho USA pageant in 2007, she caused controversy by refusing to have her picture taken with Risch because of Risch's executive order that allowed the killing of Rammell's elk. Later, Governor Risch refused to apologize for his actions.

Illegal elk kill
On November 30, 2010, Rammell was cited by the Idaho Department of Fish and Game after he killed a cow elk  in the wrong hunting zone.

On December 23, 2010, Rammell pleaded not guilty to charges of possessing wildlife taken unlawfully. Prior to trial, Rammell handed out literature from the "Fully Informed Jury" website to all jurists that day describing their rights as jurists. He was then arrested again for felony jury tampering which was later reduced to Contempt of Court and was given a withheld judgement, meaning it would not recorded on his record.

Rammel was found guilty of the wildlife charge in July 2011.  He appealed using the defense that he did not have criminal intent and had only made a simple mistake, citing an Idaho law that stated a person could not be held to a crime if the alleged crime was committed by mistake.  The conviction was upheld in the Idaho Appellate court.

Defies authorities
On December 15, 2010, at a town hall meeting held in Idaho County, Idaho, Rammell encouraged a crowd of about 100 supporters to defy Federal authorities by killing wolves while at the same time being careful not to face federal penalties

Branding Inspections 
In May 2021, Rammell was found guilty for not having proper brand inspections for four horses and a colt.

Personal life
Rammell has been married to his wife Lynda since 1983 and they have four children; the eldest, Amanda, was Miss Idaho USA in 2007.

He is a member of the Church of Jesus Christ of Latter-day Saints.

Rammell announced on June 14, 2012, that his family was moving from Rexburg, Idaho to Torrington, Wyoming, so that he could take a veterinarian job.

References

External links
 

1961 births
Living people
American activists
American Latter Day Saints
American veterinarians
Male veterinarians
Idaho Republicans
People from Rock Springs, Wyoming
People from Torrington, Wyoming
People from Rexburg, Idaho
People from Teton County, Idaho
Wyoming Republicans
Idaho politicians convicted of crimes
Candidates in the 2018 United States elections